Kevin Ray (born December 11, 1977) is an American stock car racing driver. Son of Johnny Ray, he is a former competitor in the NASCAR Busch Series and ARCA Racing Series, and was director of business operations for Turner Scott Motorsports.

Early career
Ray began his racing career in midget cars at age 7, scoring his first win at age 11. Mentored by Donnie Allison, he entered competition in the ARCA Bondo/Mar-Hyde Supercar Series in 1994 at the age of 16, making his debut at Atlanta International Raceway, finishing 38th. He went on to run 20 races in the series between 1994 and 2004, posting a best finish of fourth at Talladega Superspeedway in 1995.

In 1995, Ray made his debut in NASCAR competition, competing in the Busch Series – now the Xfinity Series – at Indianapolis Raceway Park in a car owned by his father, starting 35th and finishing 21st in what would prove to be his only race in the series. He attempted four additional races in the series between 1995 and 2003, driving for his family team and for Sadler Brothers Racing, but failed to qualify for any of them.

Cup attempt
In 2004, Ray signed with Donlavey Racing to drive the team's No. 90 Ford in the Nextel Cup Series for six races, sponsored by Boudreaux's Butt Paste. Attempting his first race at Dover International Speedway, the team failed to pass inspection; the team stepped back to ARCA, racing at Pocono Raceway in Ray's final start in the series, before the deal fell apart. Ray's No. 90 Ford was named the fifth scariest NASCAR paint scheme of all time by ESPN The Magazine in 2008.

Personal life and post-career
Ray is a graduate of Walter Wellborn High School. He is now retired from racing competition but remains active in the sport, serving as team manager for Red Horse Racing from 2007 to 2013.

In January 2014, Ray moved to Turner Scott Motorsports, becoming the team's director of business operations.

Motorsports career results

NASCAR
(key) (Bold – Pole position awarded by qualifying time. Italics – Pole position earned by points standings or practice time. * – Most laps led.)

Nextel Cup Series

Busch Series

References

External links
 

Living people
1977 births
People from Eastaboga, Alabama
Racing drivers from Alabama
NASCAR drivers
ARCA Menards Series drivers